St Columba's Church is a Category B listed building on the isle of Canna, in the Small Isles, Highland, Scotland.

History
Prior to the building of the church, the island's Protestant residents were obliged to travel 30 miles to the nearest parish church. The building of the church was instigated by Mary Johanna Cameron. She was the wife of Allan Thom, whose family owned Canna until 1938. The church was built in memory of Allan Thom's father, Robert, who purchased Canna in 1881 and had invested in improvements to the island's infrastructure. Although the church was built  to serve the island's Protestant inhabitants, Canna was and is principally Catholic.

The church is orientated East-North-East to West-South-West, rather than the more usual East-West, though why this was done is unclear. The church has a graveyard, though this contains only a single headstone; that of Joanna and Allan Thom.

In 1969, an ornamental wrought-iron gate was added to the churchyard and listed status came in 1971. Owing to the shape of its tower, the church is known informally as 'The Rocket Church'.

Present Day
Canna's present-day population rests at around 20. As most islanders are Catholic, St Columba's, whilst still consecrated for worship, is rarely used and is all but defunct.  In 2015, it was reported that the National Trust for Scotland were seeking funds to repair the church and use it as an exhibition-space for memorabilia from the 1881-1938 period. Nearby is the island's Catholic chapel, also dedicated to St Columba.

Gallery

References

Churches completed in 1914
Church of Scotland churches
Religious organizations established in 1914
1914 establishments in Scotland
Churches in Highland (council area)
Listed churches in Scotland
Category B listed buildings in Highland (council area)
Towers in Scotland
Canna, Scotland